The Arad Chapter was a collegiate chapter, established in the , in the Kingdom of Hungary. It was dedicated to Saint Martin of Tours. The chapter was under the direct jurisdiction of the archbishop of Esztergom. It held landed property in at least seven counties. From the 1220s, the chapter was a place of authentication.

History

Establishment 

Modern historians agree that Béla the Blind, King of Hungary, established the collegiate chapter between 1131 and 1141. Although the earliest extant document that refers to the Arad Chapterthe so-called Register of Aradwas issued in 1177, a royal diploma from 1399 referred to a charter of grant which was issued in favor of the chapter during the reign of King Béla. According to a scholarly theory, King Béla II set up the chapter in token of his repentance for the massacre of 68 lords at an assembly in Arad in 1131. Historian István Bóna writes that the king granted the murdered lords' estates to the new chapter. The chapter was dedicated to Saint Martin of Tours.

Modern scholars identified the large (50-meter-long) medieval church, the ruins of which were found at Glogovác (now Vladimirescu in Romania), as the seat of the Arad Chapter. The first church must have been completed before 1172, because a cemetery developed around it during the reign of Stephen III of Hungary. That church was rebuilt and a new church (the ruins of which were unearthed) was consecrated in 1224.

Heyday 

For the Arad Chapter was founded by a king, the monarchs exercised the right of patronage over it and it was also exempt of the jurisdiction of the bishops of Csanád. The chapter was composed of at least 12 canons, including the provost who was its head. Pope Honorius III attempted to expand the authority of the Holy See through appointing his own candidate, Johannes Caputius, provost in 1225, but Caputius was forced to abdicate in favor of the monarch's candidate, Albert. The chapter became a place of authentication with jurisdiction in Arad, Csanád and Zaránd counties, in 1229. Ordeals by fire were also completed before the members of the chapter thereafter.

Pope Gregory IX excommunicated Provost Albert in 1235 because Albert refused to acknowledge the authority of the archbishop of Esztergom. However, Provost Albert only yielded to Archbishop Stephen Báncsa in 1246, promising that he would attend at the synods convoked by the archbishop.

Properties 

One hermit Andrew granted landed property to the Arad Chapter in Besen, Karád and Rád villages in Somogy County during the reign of Béla the Blind. The Arad Chapter held estates in seven counties  in 1177, according to the Register of Arad which was issued upon the orders of Béla III of Hungary. Arad Castle was also the chapter's property and one third of the tolls of the ferry at Esteuerd on the Maros was due to the chapter. For instance,  in 1223, one Gregory, son of Calad, who had stolen the chapter's 150 sheep, not only returned them, but also mortgaged his estate named Chereuy to secure his compensation for the damages that he had done.

List of provosts

References

Sources

Collegiate Chapters in Hungary